A. fuliginosa may refer to:

 Amantis fuliginosa, a praying mantis species native to India
 Amphisbaena fuliginosa, the black and white amphisbaenian, a limbless lizard species 
 Antennulariella fuliginosa, a fungus species in the genus Antennulariella

See also
 Fuliginosa